Diego Meléndez de Valdés (died 1506) was a Roman Catholic prelate who served as Bishop of Zamora (1494–1506) and Bishop of Astorga (1493–1494).

Biography
In 1493, Diego Meléndez de Valdés was appointed during the papacy of Pope Alexander VI as Bishop of Astorga. In 1494, he was appointed during the papacy of Pope Gregory XIII as Bishop of Zamora. He served as Bishop of Zamora until his death in 1506.

References

External links and additional sources
 (for Chronology of Bishops) 
 (for Chronology of Bishops) 
 (for Chronology of Bishops) 
 (for Chronology of Bishops) 

 
 
 
 

15th-century Roman Catholic bishops in Castile
16th-century Roman Catholic bishops in Spain
Bishops appointed by Pope Alexander VI
1506 deaths